{{Automatic taxobox 
| image = Rhabdamia cypselura.jpg
| image_caption = Verulux cypselurus
| taxon = Verulux
| authority = T. H. Fraser, 1972 
| type_species = Rhabdamia cypselurus
| type_species_authority = Weber, 1909<ref name = CoF>{{Cof record|genid=8336|title=Verulux""|access-date=23 September 2018}}</ref>
}}Verulux is a genus of fishes in the family Apogonidae found in the Indian and Pacific Oceans.

Species
The recognized species in this genus are:
 Verulux cypselurus (M. C. W. Weber, 1909) (Swallow-tail cardinalfish)
 Verulux solmaculata'' Yoshida & Motomura, 2016 (sun-spot cardinalfish)

References

 
Apogonidae
Marine fish genera
Taxa named by Thomas H. Fraser